Artemisia frigida is a widespread species of flowering plant in the aster family, which is known as the sunflower family.  It is native to Europe, Asia, and much of North America. In parts of the north-central and northeastern United States it is an introduced species.

Etymology 
Common names include fringed sagebrush, prairie sagewort, arctic sage and pasture sage. The plant is  not, however, closely related to the true sages Salvia.

Description
Artemisia frigida is a perennial plant but with a woody base. The stems are covered in lobed gray-green leaves which are coated in silvery hairs. The inflorescence contains many spherical flower heads each about half a centimeter wide and lined with woolly-haired, gray-green or brownish phyllaries. The flower heads contain several pistillate ray florets and many bisexual disc florets. The plant is aromatic, with a strong scent. This plant can make a great many seeds. It can also spread by layering; in some years it produces very few seeds.

Artemisia frigida is common and dominant or codominant in many areas, especially in dry and disturbed habitat types. It is common in the Rocky Mountains and Great Plains in North America, where it occurs in grasslands, shrublands, and woodlands, among others. It has a tendency to increase in areas that have been heavily grazed by livestock. Overgrowth of the plant is sometimes an indicator of overgrazing on rangeland. It sometimes becomes an aggressive weed. Ranchers have considered the plant to be both an adequate forage species and a worthless nuisance species. Artemisia frigida's common name is wild sage. Sometimes known as prairie sage and sagewort.

Ecology and uses
A number of wild animals consume the plant, including white-tailed jackrabbits and sage grouse.

Artemisia frigida is cultivated for its foliage effects, and has gained the Royal Horticultural Society's Award of Garden Merit.

Artemisia frigida has a variety of uses for Indigenous peoples of North America. It is used medicinally for coughs, colds, wounds, and heartburn by the Blackfoot. The Cree people use it for headache and fever and the Tewa people took it for gastritis and indigestion. It also has ceremonial and veterinary applications, including for the Blackfoot, who reportedly used the crushed leaves to "revive gophers after children clubbed them while playing a game". Among the Zuni, the whole plant is made into an infusion for colds. Sprigs of this plant and corn ears are attached to decorated tablets and carried by female dancers in a drama. The sprigs are also dipped in water and planted with corn so the corn will grow abundantly.

Mongol herders from the Bairin Right Banner and Bairin Left Banner of Inner Mongolia prepare a water-based decoction using fresh or dried Artemisia frigida with Sabina vulgaris, Sanguisorba officinalis, Rhododendron micranthum, and Ephedra sinica to treat joint pain.

Artemisia frigida is also used in landscaping and for erosion control and revegetation of rangeland. It is drought-resistant.

References

External links

 Washington Burke Museum
 
 
 
 Santa Fe Botanical Garden

frigida
Plants described in 1803
Plants used in traditional Native American medicine
Flora of North America
Flora of Europe
Flora of temperate Asia